Alberto Ezequiel Argañaraz (nicknamed Beto Argañaraz) (born 13 November 1992) is an Argentine footballer who played as a forward.

He was born in San Miguel de Tucumán.

Clubs and statistics

References 
 Argañaraz, Alberto Ezequiel
 Alberto Ezequiel Argañaraz
 ALBERTO EZEQUIEL ARGAÑARAZ

Living people
1992 births
Argentine footballers
Association football forwards